Kungas Kuveu is a Papua New Guinean former professional rugby league footballer who played in the 1970s and 1980s.

From the New Ireland Province, he was a Papua New Guinea  who was part of the team that beat the New Zealand in 1986.

References

Rugby league fullbacks
Papua New Guinean rugby league players
Papua New Guinean sportsmen
Papua New Guinea national rugby league team players
People from New Ireland Province